Burlington Community Swimming Pools and Bathhouse in Burlington, Wisconsin, is a historic property that was listed on the National Register of Historic Places on October 23, 2013.

The property, located at 394 Amanda Street, consists of a swimming pool and bathhouse that were privately built in 1965. It was listed on the National Register as an "excellent example of contemporary style architecture," including the use of prestressed and precast concrete structural members manufactured in the local area. It was designed by Carl Iverson.

See also
National Register of Historic Places listings in Racine County, Wisconsin

References

Buildings and structures in Racine County, Wisconsin
Park buildings and structures on the National Register of Historic Places in Wisconsin
National Register of Historic Places in Racine County, Wisconsin
Infrastructure completed in 1965